Xhelal Bey Koprëncka (187621 October 1919) was an Albanian politician. He was one of the signatories of the Albanian Declaration of Independence.

References 

Signatories of the Albanian Declaration of Independence
1919 deaths
People from Skrapar
All-Albanian Congress delegates
Congress of Durrës delegates
Albanian politicians
1876 births